Beseech is  a gothic metal band from Borås, Sweden. They disbanded in 2006, and re-formed with a different line-up at the end of 2013.

Band Lineup

Current Lineup
 Robert Vintervind – guitar, programming, arrangements (1992–2006) (2013–present)
 Klas Bohlin – guitar and backing vocals (1992–2003), vocals (2013–present)
 Manne Engström – guitar (2004–2006) (2013–present)
 Angelina Sahlgren Söder – vocals (2013–present)
 Johan Örnborg – bass guitar (2013–present)
 Håkan Carlsson – drums (2013–present)

Past members
 Erik Molarin – vocals (2001–2006)
 Lotta Höglin – vocals (2000–2006)
 Jonas Strömberg – drums (1999–2006)
 Daniel Elofsson – bass guitar (1999–2006)
 Mikael Back – keyboard (1997–2006)
 Jörgen Sjöberg – vocals (1992–1998) (1999–2001)
 Nicklas Svensson – drums (1998–1999)
 Andreas Wiik – bass guitar (1994–1998)
 Morgan Gredåker – drums (1992–1998)
 Anna Andersson – keyboard and vocals (1994–1996)
 Tony Lejvell – bass guitar (1992–1994)

Live members
 Conny Pettersson - drums (2002)

Timeline

Discography

Demos
 A Lesser Kind of Evil (1992)
 Last Chapter (1994)
 Tears (1995)
 Beyond the Skies (2001)

Studio albums
 ...From a Bleeding Heart (1998)
 Black Emotions (2000)
 Souls Highway (2002)
 Drama (2004)
 Sunless Days (2005)
 My Darkness, Darkness (2016)

Videos
"Manmade Dreams" (2000)
"Between the Lines" (2002)
"Innerlane" (2005) *
"Gimme! Gimme! Gimme!" (Live 2006)
"Highwayman" (2015)
"The Shimmering" (2016)

Singles
"Beating Pulse" (2015)

Swedish heavy metal musical groups
Musical groups established in 1992
Musical groups disestablished in 2006
Musical groups established in 2014
1992 establishments in Sweden
Metal Blade Records artists